Clear Creek is a stream in Clay and Clinton counties of northwest Missouri. It is a tributary of the Fishing River.

The headwaters of the stream are in Clinton County southwest of Lathrop and it flows south-southwest into Clay County turning to the southeast to the east of Arley. It then passes under U.S. Route 35 and Missouri Route 92 east of Kearney and on to its confluence with Fishing River just north of U.S. Route 69 to the northwest of Mosby.

Clear Creek was so named on account of its clear water.

See also
List of rivers of Missouri

References

Rivers of Clay County, Missouri
Rivers of Clinton County, Missouri
Rivers of Missouri